Poistogov is a Russian masculine surname, its feminine counterpart is Poistogova. It may refer to
Ekaterina Poistogova (born 1991), Russian middle-distance runner
Stepan Poistogov (born 1986), Russian middle-distance runner, husband of Ekaterina

Russian-language surnames